Arachnanthus is a genus of tube-dwelling anemones in the family Arachnactidae. Members of the genus are found worldwide.

Characteristics
Arachnanthus species live in parchment-like tubes which are buried in muddy or sandy sediment. Some species are nocturnal.

Species
The following species are currently included in the genus according to the World Register of Marine Species:
 Arachnanthus australiae Carlgren, 1937
 Arachnanthus bockii Carlgren, 1924
 Arachnanthus lilith  Stampar & El Didi, 2018
 Arachnanthus oligopodus (Cerfontaine, 1891)
 Arachnanthus sarsi Carlgren, 1912

Arachnanthus nocturnus den Hartog, 1977 is now accepted as Isarachnanthus nocturnus (Hartog, 1977).

References

Arachnactidae